Edmonton was a territorial electoral district for the Legislative Assembly of Northwest Territories, Canada.

History
The riding was created by royal proclamation in 1883, the second district to elect a representative to the North-West Legislative Assembly, and the first within the Alberta provisional district.

In 1885 the riding of St. Albert was split off from Edmonton's northwestern area, but in 1888 two ridings were combined again, with Edmonton briefly becoming a two-member district. St. Albert was re-established in 1891, and Edmonton again elected only one member. Strathcona was also split off from Edmonton's southern part in 1902.

When Alberta became a province in 1905, the district continued on as Edmonton (Alberta).

Members of the Legislative Assembly (MLAs) 

Edmonton elected its first representative in the North-West Assembly, Edmonton Bulletin founder Frank Oliver, in a by-election in 1883. Although the Legislative Council was not dissolved, elections were held in most of the North-West Territories in 1885, and Oliver was defeated by local physician and businessman Herbert Charles Wilson, who became speaker of the Assembly.

The first general election of the territory was held in 1888, after the dissolution of the Legislative Council. This was the only election in which Edmonton was a double-member district, and both Wilson and Oliver were elected. Wilson retired from politics when the Assembly was dissolved in 1891.

As Edmonton was now a single-member district again, Oliver remained MLA for another five years, with no challengers in the 1891 or 1894 elections. He resigned to run for the House of Commons seat for Alberta, which he successfully captured.

The resulting by-election was a close race between former Edmonton mayor Matthew McCauley and the future premier of Alberta Alexander Rutherford, which McCauley won. Both men contested the seat again in the general election of 1898, but McCauley triumphed a second time.

In 1902, however, McCauley was defeated by former alderman Richard Secord. While MLA, Secord challenged Frank Oliver for his House of Commons seat in the 1904 federal election, but was defeated. He did not seek re-election when Alberta was created in 1905 (although both Rutherford and McCauley went on to become MLAs in the new province).

Election results

Elections in the 1880s

Elections in the 1890s

1902 election

See also
Edmonton Alberta provincial electoral district.
Edmonton federal electoral district.

References

External links 
The Legislative Assembly of Northwest Territories

Former electoral districts of Northwest Territories
Politics of Edmonton